The regions of Serbia include geographical and, to a lesser extent, traditional and historical areas. Geographical regions have no official status, though some of them serve as a basis for the second-level administrative divisions of Serbia, okrugs (districts of Serbia). Not being administratively defined, the boundaries of the regions are in many cases vague: they may overlap, and various geographers and publications may delineate them differently, not just in the sense of regions' extents, but also in the sense as to whether they form separate geographical entities or subsist as parts of other super-regions, etc.

For the most part, regions correspond to the valleys or to the watershed-areas of rivers and were simply named after them (some even a millennium ago), while mountain ridges and peaks often mark boundaries. In some cases, a defined region may refer only to the inhabited parts of the valleys (see župa).

Valleys and plains along the largest rivers are special cases. The Serbian language usually forms their names with the prefix po- (SavaPosavina, Danube (Dunav)Podunavlje, TisaPotisje, etc.). Considered geographical regions per se, they usually have very elongated shapes and cover large areas (Pomoravlje), sometimes spreading through several countries (Posavina, Potisje, Podrinje, etc.). For the most part they overlap with other, smaller regions established during history along their course, in most cases named after the tributaries of the main river (most notably, in the case of all three sections of Pomoravlje).

For the purpose of easier presentation in the tables, the territory of Serbia is roughly divisible into six geographical sections: northern, western, central, eastern, south-western and south. Thus the tables do not follow the political divisions. Kosovo declared independence in February 2008. Serbia and a number of UN member states have not recognised its independence, and the territory is disputed.

Northern Serbia

Western Serbia

Central Serbia

Eastern Serbia

South-Western Serbia

Southern Serbia

Kosovo

Annotations

Sources 

 Atlas of Serbia (2006); Intersistem Kartofragija; 
 Jovan Đ. Marković (1990): Enciklopedijski geografski leksikon Jugoslavije; Svjetlost-Sarajevo; 
 Mala Prosvetina Enciklopedija, Third edition (1986), Vol.I; Prosveta; 
 Auto atlas Jugoslavija-Evropa, Eleventh edition (1979); Jugoslavenski leksikografski zavod

See also 

Administrative divisions of Serbia
Geography of Serbia

References 

 
Regions
Serbia, regions